This is a list of familicides that occurred in the United States. Being part of the list of rampage killers, the latter's terms of inclusion are also applied here.

A rampage killer has been defined as follows:

This list should contain every case with at least one of the following features:
 Rampage killings with 6 or more dead 
 In all cases the perpetrator is not counted among those killed or injured.

All abbreviations used in the table are explained below. 


Rampage killers

Abbreviations and footnotes
* – Marks cases where all the victims were relatives of the perpetrator

W – A basic description of the weapons used in the murders
F – Firearms and other ranged weapons, especially rifles and handguns, but also bows and crossbows, grenade launchers, flamethrowers, or slingshots
M – Melee weapons, like knives, swords, spears, machetes, axes, clubs, rods, rocks, or bare hands
O – Any other weapons, such as bombs, hand grenades, Molotov cocktails, poison and poisonous gas, as well as vehicle and arson attacks
A – indicates that an arson attack was the only other weapon used
V – indicates that a vehicle was the only other weapon used
E – indicates that explosives of any sort were the only other weapon used
P – indicates that an anaesthetising or deadly substance of any kind was the only other weapon used (includes poisonous gas)

References

Familicides
familicide united states
Familicides
US familicides